Technical Readout: 3058 is a 1995 game supplement for BattleTech published by FASA.

Contents
Technical Readout: 3058 details conventional combat forces, updated versions of previously presented vehicles, and new Inner Sphere BattleMechs.

Reception
Alex Bund reviewed Technical Readout: 3058 for Arcane magazine, rating it a 7 out of 10 overall. Bund comments that "Like previous Technical Readouts, the 3058 edition is an essential sourcebook for both players and referees of Battle Tech or Mechwarrior."

BattleTech Tech Readout 3058 won in a tie for the Origins Awards for Best Game Accessory of 1995.

References

BattleTech supplements
Origins Award winners